Snapdragon Stadium, known during its planning and early construction phases as Aztec Stadium, is an outdoor stadium on the west coast of the United States, in San Diego, California. It is located on the campus of San Diego State University at SDSU Mission Valley, a  non-contiguous expansion parcel west of the main campus. Opened in August 2022, the 35,000-seat stadium is the home of the San Diego State Aztecs of the Mountain West Conference in NCAA Division I FBS college football.

Snapdragon Stadium is also the home of San Diego Wave FC of the National Women's Soccer League (NWSL) and the San Diego Legion of Major League Rugby (MLR). In 2023, the stadium will host the 2023 World Lacrosse Championship.

Ground was broken on August 17, 2020, and the stadium opened two years later in 2022 for an Aztecs scrimmage on August 20. Its first game was two weeks later on September 3, a 38–20 loss to the Arizona Wildcats of the Pac-12 Conference.

The venue was built adjacent to the demolished San Diego Stadium, which had been the home of the school's football program since the stadium opened in 1967 until it was razed in 2020–2021. Later known as Jack Murphy Stadium, Qualcomm Stadium, and SDCCU Stadium, it was the home of the San Diego Chargers of the National Football League (NFL) from 1967 through 2016, and the expansion San Diego Padres of Major League Baseball (MLB) from 1969 through 2003.

History

Planning 
Following the announced departure of the NFL's Chargers from what was then SDCCU Stadium to the Los Angeles area in January 2017, focus began on building a new stadium for the Aztecs that was modern and the right size for the program. Over the course of the next nearly two years, the plan for what would become Snapdragon Stadium and the rest of the SDSU Mission Valley development (initially known as SDSU West) took shape. A competing redevelopment proposal surfaced, known as SoccerCity, which envisioned the SDCCU Stadium site being leased from the city and redeveloped with private funding if San Diego was awarded a Major League Soccer (MLS) team. Under this proposal, SDSU football would have the option of sharing the proposed smaller-capacity soccer stadium with the new MLS team. The SoccerCity proposal was placed on the November 2018 ballot in competition with the SDSU Mission Valley proposal, where the SDSU Mission Valley plan emerged victorious. 

On December 5, 2019, the school announced that it had received a $15 million gift from Dianne L. Bashor to help finance the new stadium, which led to its playing surface being named Bashor Field.

On June 30, 2020, the city of San Diego approved the sale of the SDCCU Stadium site to San Diego State University and on August 10, 2020, the university officially took control of the property. San Diego State bought the entire , including the existing stadium, from the city for $88 million. Groundbreaking on the new stadium took place on August 17, just one week after SDSU took control of the site.

The stadium will seat 35,000 fans and is being built to support college football, non-football NCAA championship games, professional soccer, rugby, lacrosse, and special events such as concerts. The stadium was designed to be expandable to a capacity of 55,000 (complete with a plan and renderings for such an expansion) or more to accommodate a prospective NFL return to San Diego and/or future needs of the Aztecs football team.

On December 6, 2021, San Diego State announced a naming rights agreement with Qualcomm, who also owned the naming rights to the original stadium. The stadium became known as Snapdragon Stadium, named after Qualcomm's Snapdragon brand of Systems on a chip.

On December 15, 2021, San Diego Wave FC of the National Women's Soccer League (NWSL) announced it would move to Snapdragon Stadium starting in September 2022 following the stadium's completion; the club began its inaugural 2022 season at Torero Stadium at the University of San Diego. 

In January 2022, it was announced that San Diego would be home to the 2023 World Lacrosse Championship, with Snapdragon Stadium to be the primary venue.

On February 2, 2022, the San Diego Legion of Major League Rugby (MLR) announced Snapdragon Stadium to be their new home beginning in 2023.

On December 6, 2022, it was announced that the San Diego Seals of National Lacrosse League (NLL) would host the NLL's first-ever outdoor game on March 4, 2023. The game, which would become known as the inaugural NLL Stadium Showdown, saw the Seals beat the Las Vegas Desert Dogs 15-12.

In January 2023, the stadium hosted Monster Jam for the first time on January 7-8 and 14-15.

On January 21, 2023, the stadium hosted its first AMA Supercross Championship event.

Opening 
Snapdragon Stadium opened for a SDSU scrimmage on August 20, 2022. The first game in the stadium was played on September 3, ending with the Aztecs being defeated 38–20 by the Arizona Wildcats. The game occurred during a heat wave, resulting in heat illnesses among attendees that required the San Diego Fire-Rescue Department to send five ambulances and three fire engines to treat around 200 people, 20 of which were hospitalized. By kickoff, the game started when the temperature reached , with attendees retreating from the seating area and into shade. On social media, the stadium design was called into question by fans because of the lack of shade. On September 8, San Diego Fire-Rescue stated that the department did not receive a heat injury and illness plan from the university, having only received the medical plan two days before the game, and wrote that "it was evident that the sheer number of patients at the game quickly overwhelmed the EMS resources on site and required assistance from SDFD." Around 12:30 pm PDT (UTC−7), SDFD and EMS deputy chiefs considered asking the university to cancel the game but decided that doing so would not resolve the situation.

Wave FC set a new NWSL attendance record when it debuted in the new stadium on September 17, 2022 against Angel City FC. By August 28, about three weeks before the game, over 27,000 tickets had been sold. This total was comparable to the then-current league record of 27,278, set on August 29, 2021 when OL Reign played Portland Thorns FC at Lumen Field in Seattle as part of a doubleheader that also featured an MLS match between rivals Seattle Sounders FC and the Portland Timbers. The pre-sales for Wave FC's stadium debut had already surpassed the record for a standalone game of 25,218, set on August 11, 2019 when Thorns FC hosted the North Carolina Courage at Providence Park in Portland, Oregon. On September 1, the team announced the game had sold out, based on a soccer capacity of 32,000, and the official attendance for the game was announced as that number.

Events

Sports

Soccer 
Snapdragon Stadium is set to host a club friendly match on March 26, 2023, between Club Tijuana and Club America, both of the Liga MX.

Lacrosse

2023 National Lacrosse League Stadium Showdown 
Snapdragon Stadium hosted the National Lacrosse League's (NLL) first outdoor game between the San Diego Seals and the Las Vegas Desert Dogs, the Stadium Showdown.

2023 World Lacrosse Championship 
San Diego will be the site of the 2023 World Lacrosse Championship, with Snapdragon Stadium being announced as the primary venue in January 2022. Torero Stadium on the campus of the University of San Diego and three additional fields on the main San Diego State campus are slated to be the other venues.

Rugby

2031 and 2033 Rugby World Cup 
San Diego is amongst the cities being considered for hosting matches during the 2031 (men's) and 2033 (women's) Rugby World Cup.

Concerts

Gallery

See also 
 List of NCAA Division I FBS football stadiums

References

External links 

 

2022 establishments in California
American football venues in California
Buildings and structures in San Diego
College football venues
Lacrosse venues in California
Major League Rugby stadiums
Motorsport venues in California
National Women's Soccer League stadiums
Rugby union stadiums in San Diego
San Diego State Aztecs football venues
Soccer venues in California
Sports venues completed in 2022
Sports venues in San Diego
Venues of the 2028 Summer Olympics